Dean Andrew Harriss is an Australian politician. At a May 2022 by-election, he was elected to the Tasmanian Legislative Council as the independent member for Huon, following the resignation of Labor-turned-independent MLC Bastian Seidel.

Harriss is the son of former Huon MLC Paul Harriss.

References

External links

Year of birth missing (living people)
Living people
Members of the Tasmanian Legislative Council
Independent members of the Parliament of Tasmania
21st-century Australian politicians